Jakub Sedláček (born 9 March 1998) is a Slovak footballer who plays as a midfielder.

Club career

Železiarne Podbrezová
Sedláček made his Fortuna Liga debut for Železiarne Podbrezová against AS Trenčín on 3 November 2017. He made 16 league appearances for the club.

Pohronie
Sedláček initially signed for Pohronie on a half-season loan, during the winter of 2019. In 13 matches, he scored two goals, in the last two fixtures of the season, against Komárno and Fluminense Šamorín, thus securing Pohronie a title in the 2. Liga and subsequent promotion to Fortuna Liga. In the top division, Sedláček had completed 13 fixtures during half of the season. He was released with numerous other players in December 2019.

Újpest
Despite the fact that Pohronie had been at the bottom of the Fortuna Liga table, on 31 January 2020 it was announced that Sedláček had signed a 3,5 year deal with Újpest, competing in Hungarian NB I. Sedláček had acknowledged feeling of respect towards the move, considering the history and past successes of the club.

References

External links
 FK Železiarne Podbrezová official club profile 
 
 Futbalnet profile

1998 births
Living people
Sportspeople from Trenčín
Slovak footballers
Slovakia youth international footballers
Slovak expatriate footballers
Association football midfielders
FK Železiarne Podbrezová players
FK Pohronie players
Újpest FC players
Partizán Bardejov players
FC Nitra players
FK Humenné players
Slovak Super Liga players
2. Liga (Slovakia) players
Nemzeti Bajnokság I players
3. Liga (Slovakia) players
Slovak expatriate sportspeople in Hungary
Expatriate footballers in Hungary